This is a list of the named geological folds affecting the rocks of Great Britain and the Isle of Man.

Terminology

See the main article on folds for a fuller treatment of fold types and nomenclature but in brief, an anticline is an arch-like fold whereas a syncline is its converse; a downfold. Antiforms, anticlinoria, synforms and synclinoria are variations on these. A monocline (or, rarely, a monoform) is a step-like fold, one limb of which is roughly horizontal. Both domes and periclines are anticlines in which the strata fall away about equally in all directions.

There are also a number of 'disturbances' named in parts of the country, notably in South Wales. These linear features are a combination of faults and folds - the relative importance of faulting and folding varying along the length of each disturbance.

List of folds

Key to table

Column 1 indicates the name of the fold. Some variant spellings are recorded between sources.
Column 2 indicates the county in which the fold occurs. Some traverse two or more counties of course.
Column 3 indicates in which of the constituent countries of Great Britain the fold lies. (Note that the Isle of Man does not form a part of Great Britain but is included here for convenience.)
Column 4 indicates on which 1:50,000 or 1" scale geological map sheet published by the British Geological Survey (BGS) the fold is shown and named (either on map/s or cross-section/s or both). 'E&W' signifies the series of sheets published to cover England and Wales. A handful of maps at other scales are also listed where they depict the feature concerned.
Column 5 indicates a selection of publications in which references to the fold may be found. See references section for full details of publication.

List of Disturbances
The following named features comprise both faulting and folding;

References

Maps
 1:625,000 scale geological map 2007, Bedrock Geology UK North, British Geological Survey, Keyworth, Notts (UK north 625K)
 1:625,000 scale geological map 2007, Bedrock Geology UK South, British Geological Survey, Keyworth, Notts (UK south 625K)
 1:250,000 scale geological map Mid Wales and the Marches, British Geological Survey, Keyworth, Notts (Mid Wales & Marches 250K)
 various of 1:50,000 scale geological maps of England and Wales, British Geological Survey, Keyworth, Notts (E & W no.)
 1:50,000 scale geological map; Scotland Special Sheet Assynt, British Geological Survey, Keyworth, Notts (Assynt (Special 50K))
 1:50,000 scale geological map; Special Sheet Isle of Man, British Geological Survey, Keyworth, Notts (IoM (50K special sheet))

Books
 Aitkenhead, N. et al. 2002. British Regional Geology: the Pennines and adjacent areas (4th edn) British Geological Survey, Nottingham (BGS:BRG 8)
 Allen, J R L, Thomas, R L, and Williams, B P J. 1982. The Old Red Sandstone north of Milford Haven. 123–149 in Geological excursions in Dyfed, south-west Wales. BASSETT, M G (editor). (Cardiff: Published for the Geologists’ Association by the National Museum of Wales.) (Allen et al 1982)
 Barclay, W.J. 2011 Geology of the Swansea District - a brief explanation of the geological map Sheet explanation of the British Geological Survey 1:50K sheet 247 Swansea (England and Wales) (Brief expln to E&W 247, 2011)
 Barton et al. 2011. Geology of South Dorset and South-east Devon and its World Heritage Coast, Special Memoir of the British Geological Survey (Mem E&W 328etc)
 Brenchley, P.J. & Rawson, P.F. (eds) 2006. The Geology of England and Wales, (2nd edn) The Geological Society, London (Brenchley & Rawson 2006)
 Cope, J.C.W. 2012 GA Guide no 22: Geology of the Dorset Coast, Geologists' Association,  (GA Guide22)
 Day J.B.W. 1970. Geology of the Country around Bewcastle London:HMSO (Day 1970)
 Earp, J.R. & Hains, B.A. 1971. [https://archive.org/details/welsh-borderland-3rd-edn-british-regional-geology British Regional Geology: Welsh Borderland (3rd edn)] London:HMSO (Earp & Hains 1971)
 Emeleus, C.H. & Bell, B.R. 2005. British Regional Geology:the Palaeogene volcanic districts of Scotland (4th edn) British Geological Survey, Nottingham (BGS:BRG 3)
 Goodenough, K.M. & Krabbendam, M. 2011 A Geological Excursion Guide to the North-west Highlands of Scotland, Edinburgh Geological Society,  (G & K 2011)
 Green, G.W. 1992 British Regional Geology: Bristol and Gloucester Region(3rd edn), London, HMSO for British Geological Survey (BGS:BRG 16)
 Hains, B.A. & Horton, A., 1969 British Regional Geology: Central England, London, HMSO for British Geological Survey (BGS:BRG 10)
 Johnstone, G.S. & Mykura, W., 1989 British Regional Geology: The Northern Highlands of Scotland, (4th edn) London: HMSO for the British Geological Survey (BGS:BRG 2)
 Kent, P., Gaunt, G.D. & Wood, C.J., 1980 . British Regional Geology:Eastern England from the Tees to The Wash, London HMSO (BGS:BRG9)
 Mykura, W. 1976 British Regional Geology: Orkney and Shetland, Institute of Geological Sciences, Edinburgh: HMSO for the British Geological Survey (BGS:BRG 1)
 Plant, J.A., Jones, D.G. & Haslam H.W. 1999 The Cheshire Basin: basin evolution, fluid movement and mineral resources in a Permo-Triassic rift setting, British Geological Survey, Nottingham (Plant et al. 1999)
 Smith et al. 2005 Structure & Evolution of the south-west Pennine Basin and adjacent area. Subsurface memoir of the British Geological Survey. (Smith et al. 2005)
 Stone et al. 2010. British Regional Geology: Northern England (5th edn) British Geological Survey, Nottingham (BGS:BRG 7)
 Toghill, P. 2006 Geology of Shropshire (2nd edn) Crowood Press, Wilts (Toghill P 2006)
 Trewin, NH (ed) 2002. The Geology of Scotland. The Geological Society, London (Trewin (ed) 2002)
 Warren et al. 1984, Geology of the country around Rhyl and Denbigh, Mem Br Geol Svy, sheets 95 and 107 (Mem E&W 95/107)
 Webby, B.D. 1965 Proceedings of the Geologists' Association. volume 76, part 1 (Proc.Geol.Ass'n v76, pt1, 1965)
 Welch, F.B.A. & Trotter, F.M. 1961 Geology of the Country around Monmouth and Chepstow, HMSO (explanation of 1" geol. sheets 233 & 250 (England and Wales) (Welch, FBA & Trotter, FM 1961'')

See also

 List of geological faults of England
 List of geological faults of Northern Ireland
 List of geological faults of Scotland
 List of geological faults of Wales
 Geological structure of Great Britain

Geology of England
Geology of Wales
Geology of Great Britain
Geological folds
Geological folds